"Kiss of Death" (stylized as "KISS OF DEATH") is a song recorded by Japanese singer Mika Nakashima, released as a single by Sony Music Associated Records on March 7, 2018. It was written and produced by L'Arc-en-Ciel's Hyde. The song marks the first collaboration between Nakashima and Hyde in thirteen years, since "Glamorous Sky". "Kiss of Death" is the opening theme to the Tokyo MX anime series Darling in the Franxx. The title track was released digitally in advance after premiering on the series' second episode, on January 20, 2018.

Chart performance
Upon being released digitally, "Kiss of Death" charted at number 12 on the weekly RecoChoku Singles Chart and at number 6 on the weekly Mora Singles Chart. It also debuted on several Billboard Japan charts: at number 81 on the Hot 100, number 19 on Hot Animation and number 23 on Download Songs. "Kiss of Death" entered the weekly Oricon Digital Singles Chart at number 22, selling 5,000 copies in its first charting week. The song stayed at number 22 the following week, bringing its total reported digital sales figure to 10,000 copies.

The physical release of "Kiss of Death" entered the daily Oricon Singles Chart at number 16. It peaked at number 9 the following day. The single debuted at number 17 on the weekly Oricon Albums Chart, with 7,000 copies sold in its first week.

Track listing

Charts

Awards

References

Songs about kissing
2018 songs
2018 singles
Anime songs
Crunchyroll Anime Awards winners
Darling in the Franxx
Mika Nakashima songs
Songs written by Hyde (musician)
Sony Music Associated Records singles